Doug Pottinger (born September 18, 1973) is a Canadian-American curler from Eden Prairie, Minnesota. He is originally from Brandon, Manitoba, Canada.

At the national level, he is a 2004 United States men's curling champion.

Teams

Men's

Mixed doubles

Personal life
Pottinger met his wife Allison at the 1995 World Women's Curling Championship, where he was working on the ice crew and she was the alternate for Lisa Schoeneberg's team. Allison is a two-time Olympian and 2003 World Champion. They have two daughters.

He started curling in 1983 when he was at the age of 10.

Pottinger works as business manager for BRANDT.

References

External links

Living people
1973 births
Sportspeople from Brandon, Manitoba
American male curlers
American curling champions
Canadian male curlers
Curlers from Manitoba
Continental Cup of Curling participants
Canadian emigrants to the United States
People from Eden Prairie, Minnesota
Sportspeople from the Minneapolis–Saint Paul metropolitan area